Meyham, also rendered as Meham, may refer to:
 Meyham-e Olya
 Meyham-e Sofla